Danielle Goyette (born January 30, 1966) is a Canadian former ice hockey player who played on the Canada women's national ice hockey team. In 2013, she was inducted into the IIHF Hall of Fame. In 2017, she was inducted into the Hockey Hall of Fame. Goyette was made a member of the Order of Hockey in Canada in 2018.

Playing career
Born in Saint-Nazaire, Quebec, Goyette played for the Sherbrooke Jofa-Titan squad in the League Régionale du Hockey au Féminin under head coach David Downer, in the province of Québec.

Hockey Canada
In the gold medal game at the 1998 Winter Olympics, Goyette scored the only goal for Canada.  It would be the first Canadian goal ever scored in an Olympic women’s ice hockey gold medal game. She ranked first at the 2002 Winter Olympics with 7 assists and tied for first with 10 points. Four years earlier, Goyette had 8 goals in the 1998 Olympics. She finished her international career with 113 goals and 105 assists while appearing in 171 games.

In 2006, Goyette was selected to carry the Canadian flag during the Opening Ceremonies of the 2006 Winter Olympics in Turin, Italy. At the age of 42, she was the oldest current member of Team Canada at the time of her retirement in 2008.

Goyette has won three Olympic medals, gold in both Turin (2006) and Salt Lake City (2002) and a silver medal in Nagano (1998). She has also had a lot of success with Team Canada at the world championships, capturing seven Gold medals as well as one silver.

For the IIHF World Championships, Goyette is Canada's all-time leading scorer (29 goals and 53 points in eight tournaments).

National Women's Hockey League
In the 2003 she played for the Calgary Oval X-Treme in the National Women's Hockey League. Goyette scored a goal in the 2003 Esso Women's National Hockey Championship to help Team Alberta win the Abby Hoffman Cup.

Coaching
In 2007, Goyette was named head coach of the University of Calgary Dinos women's hockey program. The Calgary Dinos won the women's 2011–12 Canadian Interuniversity Sport National Championships in Edmonton, Alberta. Goyette was named Canada West Conference Coach of the Year in 2019–20.

In the summer of 2010, Goyette participated in the evaluation camp for the 2010–11 Canadian national women's team. She was a coach for Canada Red (the camp was divided into four teams: Red, White, Yellow, Blue).

In 2019, she was named the director of player development for the Toronto Maple Leafs. In February 2022, the Newfoundland Growlers, the ECHL affiliate of the Maple Leafs, hired Goyette as a temporary assistant coach when head coach Eric Wellwood was unavailable to coach due to COVID-19 protocols, making Goyette the first woman to coach for an ECHL team.

World championships
1992 – Tampere, Finland – Gold
1994 – Lake Placid, United States – Gold
1997 – Kitchener, Canada – Gold
1999 – Espoo, Finland – Gold
2000 – Mississauga, Canada – Gold
2001 – Minneapolis, United States – Gold
2004 – Halifax, Canada – Gold
2005 – Linköping, Sweden – Silver
2007 – Winnipeg, Manitoba, Canada – Gold

Awards and honours
Most Valuable Player, 2003 Esso Women's Nationals

References

1966 births
Living people
Calgary Oval X-Treme players
Canadian women's ice hockey forwards
Hockey Hall of Fame inductees
Ice hockey people from Quebec
Ice hockey players at the 1998 Winter Olympics
Ice hockey players at the 2002 Winter Olympics
Ice hockey players at the 2006 Winter Olympics
IIHF Hall of Fame inductees
Medalists at the 1998 Winter Olympics
Medalists at the 2002 Winter Olympics
Medalists at the 2006 Winter Olympics
Olympic gold medalists for Canada
Olympic ice hockey players of Canada
Olympic medalists in ice hockey
Olympic silver medalists for Canada
Order of Hockey in Canada recipients